Skalmantas or Skolomend is the name of a possible ancestor of the Gediminid dynasty. In 1975 historian Jerzy Ochmański noted that Zadonshchina, a poem from the end of the 14th century, contains lines in which two sons of Algirdas name their ancestors: "We are two brothers – sons of Algirdas, and grandsons of Gediminas, and great-grandsons of Skalmantas (Skolomend)." This led to the hypothesis that Skalmantas was the long-sought ancestor of the Gediminids.

According to Synodik of Liubech, a duke Gomantas (who might have been this Skalmantas) had a daughter Helena (probably adult baptismal name, not original Lithuanian) who married the Chernihiv Rurikid princeling Andrew, duke of Kozelsk (died 1339, born perhaps in 1280s), an ancestral uncle of the Oginskis, Puzyna, Gortsakov, Yeletsky, Zvenigorodsky, Bolkhovskoy, Mosalsky and Khotetovsky princely lineages. The property listing of metropolitan Theognostus from mid-14th century reveals that duke Andrew Mstislavich of Kozelsk was married with a lady who was sister (or daughter) of king Gediminas.

See also
Family of Gediminas
Gediminid dynasty

References

Literature
  Задонщина / Подготовка текста и примечания Л. А. Дмитриева // Изборник (Сборник произведений литературы Древней Руси) / Составители и общие редакторы Л. А. Дмитриев и Д. С. Лихачёв. — Москва: Художественная литература, 1969. — С. 380—397, 747—750 (примечания).

Gediminids